The 1957–58 NBA season was the 12th season of the National Basketball Association. The season ended with the St. Louis Hawks winning the NBA Championship, beating the Boston Celtics 4 games to 2 in the NBA Finals.

Notable occurrences 
 The Pistons relocate from Fort Wayne, Indiana to Detroit, Michigan.
 The Royals relocate from Rochester, New York to Cincinnati, Ohio 
Royals player Maurice Stokes suffers major head injury during the last game of the regular season. Stokes would later become paralyzed from the injury and cared for by teammate/life long friend Jack Twyman. The Twyman–Stokes Teammate of the Year Award is given in their honor.
 The 1958 NBA All-Star Game was played in St. Louis, Missouri, with the East beating the West 130–118. Local hero Bob Pettit of the St. Louis Hawks wins the game's MVP award.

Final standings

Eastern Division

Western Division

x – clinched playoff spot

Playoffs

Statistics leaders

Note: Prior to the 1969–70 season, league leaders in points, rebounds, and assists were determined by totals rather than averages.

NBA awards
Most Valuable Player: Bill Russell, Boston Celtics
Rookie of the Year: Woody Sauldsberry, Philadelphia Warriors

All-NBA First Team:
F – Dolph Schayes, Syracuse Nationals
F – George Yardley, Detroit Pistons
C – Bob Pettit, St. Louis Hawks
G – Bob Cousy, Boston Celtics
G – Bill Sharman, Boston Celtics

 All-NBA Second Team:
F – Cliff Hagan, St. Louis Hawks
F – Maurice Stokes, Cincinnati Royals
C – Bill Russell, Boston Celtics
G – Tom Gola, Philadelphia Warriors 
G – Slater Martin, St. Louis Hawks

References
1957–58 NBA Season Summary basketball-reference.com. Retrieved December 10, 2010